The Nowruz Cup or Navruz Cup is an international exhibition association football tournament organised by CAFA.

The inaugural competition took place in 2022 in Namangan, Uzbekistan.

Results

2022

1/2 Final

3rd Final

Final

Most successful national teams

References

General

Specific

External links

International association football competitions in Asia
International men's association football invitational tournaments
CAFA competitions